Fernando García Lleó (born September 25, 1966) is a former Spanish tennis player who won two bronze medals at the 1987 Mediterranean Games.

His only ATP Tour main draw appearance came at the 1986 Madrid Open in doubles, partnering with Aniceto Álvarez.

Also in doubles, he won the title at the 1990 Open Castilla y León, this time partnering with Jesús Manteca. They defeated Francisco Clavet and Javier Sánchez in the final.

Challenger finals

Singles: 1 (0–1)

References

External links

Spanish male tennis players
Living people
1966 births
Mediterranean Games bronze medalists for Spain
Competitors at the 1987 Mediterranean Games
Mediterranean Games medalists in tennis